Dunc's Halloween is the fifth novel in the Culpepper Adventures series by Gary Paulsen. It is about Dunc and Amos who are planning a route to get the most Halloween candy, but when Amos is bitten by a werewolf their plans change completely. It was published on September 1, 1992 by Dell Publishing.

Novels by Gary Paulsen
1992 American novels
Halloween children's books
Werewolf novels